Harveen Srao is an Indian sport shooter. She won a silver medal in the Women's 10 metre air pistol team in the 2006 Doha Asian Games.

References

1986 births
Living people
Indian female sport shooters
Shooters at the 2006 Asian Games
Asian Games medalists in shooting
Asian Games silver medalists for India
Medalists at the 2006 Asian Games
Universiade medalists for India
Universiade medalists in shooting
Medalists at the 2011 Summer Universiade